Nattestid ser porten vid (English: Nighttime Sees the Gate Wide), appears on the album cover as Nattestid..., is the first full-length album released by Norwegian black metal band Taake. It was released by Wounded Love Records in 1999. The album was written entirely by Hoest, but he brought in a session musician, Tundra, to perform bass and drums. It was recorded throughout 1997 and 1998 at Grieghallen. Nattestid is part one of a trilogy. All the writing on the CD and lyrics in the booklet are written in runes. All of the lyrics are sung in Norwegian.

Track listing
All lyrics and music by Hoest.  Arrangements by Hoest and Frostein Tundra Arctander.

Personnel

Taake
Hoest: Vocals, guitars
Frostein Tundra Arctander: Bass, drums, choirs

Additional personnel
Pytten: Producer

References

1999 albums
Taake albums